Atle Lie McGrath (born 21 April 2000) is a Norwegian World Cup alpine ski racer, a member of the Norwegian Alpine Ski Team. He gained his first World Cup podium in December 2020 in a giant slalom at Alta Badia, Italy, and his first win in March 2022 in slalom at Flachau, Austria.

Skiing career 
Lie McGrath competed at the Junior World Championships in 2018 and 2019; he raced all of the events (DH, SG, AC, GS, and SL) both years. In 2018, he was the best U18 skier in three events; in 2019, he was the silver medalist in the combined. Lie McGrath was also fourth in the downhill, just 0.01 second from the podium.

World Cup results

Season standings

Race podiums
 2 wins - (2 SL)
 5 podiums – (3 SL, 1 GS, 1 PG)

Olympic results

Personal life 
Born in the United States in Vermont, Lie McGrath moved to Oslo when he was two years old. His father, American Felix McGrath, raced for the U.S. Ski Team on the World Cup circuit from 1984 through 1990. His mother, Selma Lie, was a cross-country ski racer in Norway and on the NCAA circuit for the University of Vermont. He also has a younger brother named Leo.

Lie McGrath grew up as a multisport athlete, also racing cross-country skiing until age 12 and playing football until age 15. He represents the sports club Bærums SK.

References

External links
 
 
 Atle Lie McGrath at Head Skis
 
 
 

2000 births
Living people
Sportspeople from Bærum
Sportspeople from Vermont
Norwegian male alpine skiers
Norwegian people of American descent
Alpine skiers at the 2022 Winter Olympics
Olympic alpine skiers of Norway